pvlib python is open source software for simulating solar power of photovoltaic energy systems.

History 
pvlib python is based on PV_LIB MATLAB which was originally developed in 2012 at Sandia National Laboratories as part of the PV Performance Modeling Collaborative (PVPMC) by researchers Josh Stein, Cliff Hansen, and Daniel Riley. In August 2013, Rob Andrews made the first open source commit on GitHub and began porting the MATLAB version to Python. Later he was joined by William Holmgren and Tony Lorenzo who completed the migration and released the first version to the Python Package Index (PyPI) on April 20, 2015. Since then there have been 9 major releases. pvlib python has been joined by over 90 contributors, has been starred and forked on GitHub over 700 times, and its Journal of Open Source Software (JOSS) paper has been cited over 350 times. pvlib python is designated as a "critical project" on the PyPI, meaning it is in the top 1% of the package index by download count.

In 2019, pvlib python became an Affiliated Project with NumFOCUS. In 2021, pvlib python participated under the NumFOCUS umbrella GSoC application with a project to add more solar resource data. pvlib python has also been awarded NumFOCUS small development grants for adding battery energy storage system (BESS) functionality (2021) and infrastructure for user group tutorials (2022).

Functionality 
pvlib python's documentation is online and includes many theory topics, an intro tutorial, an example gallery, and an  API reference. The software is broken down by the steps shown in the PVPMC modeling diagram.

 irradiance and weather retrieval and solar position calculation
 irradiance decomposition and transposition to the plane of the array
 soiling and shading
 cell temperature
 conversion from irradiance to power
 DC ohmic and electrical mismatch losses
 max power point tracking
 inverter efficiency
 AC losses
 long term degradation

Installation and contributions 
pvlib python can be installed directly from the PyPI or from conda-forge. The source code is maintained on GitHub and new contributors are welcome to post issues or create pull requests. There is also a forum for discussion and questions.

Examples 
pvlib python is organized into low level functions and high level classes that allow multiple approaches to solving typical PV problems.

Solar position 
import pandas as pd
from pvlib.solarposition import get_solarposition

times = pd.date_range(start="2021-01-01", end="2021-02-01", freq="H", tz="EST")
solpos = get_solarposition(time=times, latitude=40.0, longitude=-80)

In The News 
 In episode #76 of the Talk Python podcast, Anna Schneider, co-founder of Watttime, shares how she used pvlib python among other tools to forecast PV production in realtime.
 pvlib python maintainer Mark Mikofski discussed pvlib's history and its role in the renewable energy industry in a Mouse vs. Python interview.
 In a workshop held by the Solar Energy Technologies Office (part of the United States Department of Energy) on encouraging community contribution to open-source software projects, pvlib python was discussed as an example of having achieved a significant user base.
 In an interview with Solar Power Portal, Jeff Ressler, CEO of Clean Power Research, discussed how their products and customers benefit from using pvlib python.

See also 
 Open energy system models > Programming components

References

Further reading 
 J. S. Stein, “The photovoltaic performance modeling collaborative (PVPMC),” in Photovoltaic Specialists Conference, 2012.
 R.W. Andrews, J.S. Stein, C. Hansen, and D. Riley, “Introduction to the open source pvlib for python photovoltaic system modelling package,” in 40th IEEE Photovoltaic Specialist Conference, 2014. (paper)
 W.F. Holmgren, R.W. Andrews, A.T. Lorenzo, and J.S. Stein, “PVLIB Python 2015,” in 42nd Photovoltaic Specialists Conference, 2015. (paper and the notebook to reproduce the figures)
 J.S. Stein, W.F. Holmgren, J. Forbess, and C.W. Hansen, “PVLIB: Open Source Photovoltaic Performance Modeling Functions for Matlab and Python,” in 43rd Photovoltaic Specialists Conference, 2016.
 W.F. Holmgren and D.G. Groenendyk, “An Open Source Solar Power Forecasting Tool Using PVLIB-Python,” in 43rd Photovoltaic Specialists Conference, 2016.

External links 
 

2015 software
Python (programming language) scientific libraries
Free software programmed in Python
Software using the BSD license
Photovoltaics